Godfridus Mathias (Godfried) Pieters (born 25 November 1936) is a Dutch sculptor.

Life and work 
Pieters was educated at the Maastricht Institute of Arts and the Jan van Eyck Academie in Maastricht. His oeuvre shows a preference for the human figure (especially torsos and heads) and nature (birds, fish and plants and tubers), which he depicts in a realistic style.

Works

References

1936 births
Living people
Dutch male sculptors
20th-century Dutch sculptors
21st-century Dutch sculptors
People from Bunde